Wanlessia denticulata is a species of jumping spider.

Name
The specific name is derived from the status of the teeth of the chelicera.

Distribution
Wanlessia denticulata is only known from Taiwan.

References

  (2002): Five new and four newly recorded species of jumping spiders from Taiwan (Araneae: Salticidae). Zoological Studies 41(1): 1-12. PDF

Salticidae
Spiders described in 2002
Spiders of Taiwan
Endemic fauna of Taiwan